Imbrication 2: An Investigaton Into Documenting Change Systems the second split album by PGR/Thessalonians, released in 1988 by Angakok.

Track listing

Personnel
Adapted from the Imbrication 2: An Investigaton Into Documenting Change Systems liner notes.

Thessalonians
 Kim Cascone – instruments, production, mixing
 David Gardner – instruments
 David James – instruments
 Kurt Robinson – instruments
 Larry Thrasher – instruments

Production and design
 Jerry Beasley – engineering
 Kathleen Cascone (as Kathleen Parker) – typography
 Anthony Michael King (as AMK) – design
 Leonard Marcel – mixing

Release history

References

External links 
 Imbrication 2: An Investigaton Into Documenting Change Systems at Discogs (list of releases)

1988 albums
Split albums
PGR (American band) albums
Thessalonians (band) albums